Sanjib Sardar is an Indian politician and member of the Jharkhand Mukti Morcha. Sardar is a member of the Jharkhand Legislative Assembly from the Potka constituency in Purbi Singhbhum district.

See also 
Maneka Sardar
Amulya Sardar
Sanatan Sardar

References

Indian politicians
People from East Singhbhum district
Jharkhand MLAs 2019–2024
Members of the Jharkhand Legislative Assembly
Jharkhand politicians
Living people
21st-century Indian politicians
Jharkhand Mukti Morcha politicians
Year of birth missing (living people)
Bhumij people
Adivasi politicians